is a Japanese retired Nippon Professional Baseball player. He was raised in Osaka. After playing, Tao managed the Tohoku Rakuten Golden Eagles. In his one year as manager, the Eagles finished in last in the PL and was the first PL team in 40 years to lose over 90 games in a single season.

References

External links
Career statistics and player information from Baseball-Reference or NPB (in Japanese)

1954 births
Living people
Baseball people from Kagawa Prefecture
Baseball people from Osaka
Doshisha University alumni
Japanese baseball players
Nippon Professional Baseball outfielders
Chunichi Dragons players
Seibu Lions players
Hanshin Tigers players
Nippon Professional Baseball Rookie of the Year Award winners
Managers of baseball teams in Japan
Tohoku Rakuten Golden Eagles managers
People from Mitoyo, Kagawa